Telenovela, also stylized TeleNovela, is South Korean cable and satellite specialty channel.

The network transmits in SD (Standard-definition) until 2019 and in HD (High-definition) with approximately 7 million subscribers by December 2010.

Both channels' programming includes scripted television series (Brazilian telenovelas produced by Rede Globo), miniseries, films, documentaries, specials and other programs. All are subtitles in Korean to adapt to the local culture and then in Portuguese and Tetun to East Timor.

See also 
Media of South Korea
Telecommunications in South Korea

References

External links 
  

Television channels in South Korea
Television networks in South Korea
Korean-language television stations
Mass media companies of South Korea